Arnarstapi or Stapi is a small fishing village at the foot of Mt. Stapafell  between Hellnar village and Breiðavík  farms on the southern side of Snæfellsnes, Iceland.

Placenames in the vicinity of Arnarstapi and nearby Hellnar village are inspired by Bárðar saga Snæfellsáss, an Icelandic saga relating the story of Bárður, a half human and half ogre. Arnarstapi was a natural site for landings and harbor for small vessels, and therefore ideal for a shipping port. In the olden days, Arnarstapi was thus from very early on, a busy fishing port and commercial centre servicing the West coast area under the Danish crown and a merchant monopoly of Denmark was in effect from 1565. From then on and through the 17th and 18th century, agents of the Danish crown had custodial power over Arnarstapi and commercial rights by royal appointment over nearby lands, formerly owned by Helgafell monastery and monopoly of all trade in the area. Several old houses from that time, each with its own unique history, can be seen at Arnarstapi, the old Amtmannshús (The Danish Prefect's Residence (1774–1787) having a history of its own, it having been moved in 1849 to nearby Vogur á Mýrum , where it stayed until 1983, when it was moved back again to Arnarstapi in 1985 and declared a historical site in 1990. There resided amongst other notables, Danish Prefect Bjarni Thorsteinsson (1821–1849), whose son was renowned poet and writer Steingrímur Thorsteinsson.

Today Arnarstapi is still a somewhat busy harbor during the summer months serving private fishing and recreational vessels as well with its maintained docks that were renewed in 2002. Being a popular destination of tourists in summer, Arnarstapi is today a thriving centre for local tourism activities where there is a variety of natural and culinary attractions as well and a cluster of second homes are located in and around the village. There is much beauty to be found in nearby attractions, and an old horse trail past Neðstavatn  is now a popular hiking trail across the lava and along the beach between Arnarstapi and Hellnar. This walk is about one hour. The lava field is called Hellnahraun, and its coast where at its westernmost edge can be found the ancient small village of Hellnar is a natural preserve. Along the coast there are some unique rock formations to be seen. There the waves of the ocean play along with the sun and the daylight to produce a natural show of which the most spectacular can be experienced at the cliff Gatklettur , and the rifts Hundagjá , Miðgjá  and Músagjá . Near Arnarstapi you will also find many other interesting natural wonders like Rauðfeldsgjá, Dritvík , Bjarnarfoss  and Lóndrangar.

In popular culture
In Jules Verne's A Journey to the Center of the Earth, Stapi is the last stop on the route the protagonists take before they climb Snæfellsjökull and enter the interior of the planet through a tunnel in the crater.

References

Sources 

 The Coast Arnarstapi to Hellnar nat.is
 https://web.archive.org/web/20110722022617/http://www.west.is/Home/AboutWestIceland/TownsVillages/Olafsvik/Placesofinterest/67
 Þorsteinn Jósepsson, Steindór Steindórsson,Páll Líndal, Landið þitt Ísland, A-G,Örn og Örlygur 1982

Populated places in Western Region (Iceland)
Snæfellsnes Volcanic Belt
Snæfellsnes
Tourist attractions in Iceland